Naduvile is a village in Kottayam district in the state of Kerala, India.

Demographics
 India census, Naduvile had a population of 7441 with 3597 males and 3844 females.

References

Villages in Kottayam district